"I've Been Lookin'" is a song written by Jeff Hanna and Jimmy Ibbotson, and recorded by American country music group Nitty Gritty Dirt Band.  It was released in August 1988 as the second single from the album Workin' Band.  The song reached No. 2 on the Billboard Hot Country Singles & Tracks chart.

Charts

Weekly charts

Year-end charts

References

1988 singles
1988 songs
Nitty Gritty Dirt Band songs
Song recordings produced by Josh Leo
Warner Records singles
Songs written by Jimmy Ibbotson
Songs written by Jeff Hanna